Transports et Travaux Aériens de Madagascar (TTAM) was an airline based in Madagascar. It was founded in 1954 and became a subsidiary of Air Madagascar in the early 1960s. It operated Piper aircraft and the ATR 42 on charter flights, on regional flights and for agricultural purposes. TTAM ceased operations in January 2002.

History
TTAM was established in 1954 as Travaux Aériens de Madagascar (TAM). Its founders are Bernard and Pierre Obrecht, Travaux Aériens du Midi et de l'Afrique du Nord and the company Marseillaise de Madagascar, the primary stakeholder at the time of foundation. In the early 1960s, Marseillaise de Madagascar sold its shares to Air Madagascar. Between 1965 and 1970, the airline obtained three Piper PA-18 Super Cubs and ten Piper PA-25 Pawnees, most of which were used as agricultural aircraft. TAM also operated many charter flights.

The airline leased an ATR 42-320 in October 1994 and changed its name to Transports et Travaux Aériens de Madagascar (TTAM) around this time. TTAM later purchased its own ATR 42-500, which was used on flights to the Comoros, Mayotte and Réunion. The airline ended operations in January 2002.

Corporate affairs
In 1998, Air Madagascar had a 34% stake in TTAM, while private individuals held the rest. The president of TTAM was Jean-Louis Rajaonarivelo, and its general manager was Solonaivo Rakotomalala. The airline had 140 employees at the time.

Destinations

The airline's destinations included the following in 1998:

Fleet
TTAM's fleet included the following aircraft in 1998: one ATR 42-500, three Piper PA-23s, one Piper PA-31 Navajo and several light aircraft.

See also		
 List of defunct airlines of Madagascar

References

External links
 

Defunct airlines of Madagascar
Airlines established in 1954
Airlines disestablished in 2002